A Berkemeyer is a drinking glass with a wide, flared bowl, dating from 15th-century Germany and the Netherlands, and still made today. They have a characteristic green or yellow colour caused by iron impurities in the sand used for glass production. The thick, hollow stem is covered with prunts providing a secure grip for hands greasy from feasting, similar to the römer.

Berkemeyers were originally carved from birch tree branches (berkemei) and were provided with lids. The prunts on the stems of glasses reminded drinkers of the rough bark of the wooden beakers, hence the association. They were frequently depicted in still lifes of table settings by the Dutch masters in the 17th and 18th centuries.

References

Drinkware